Elisabeth Hardy (born Elisabeth Mary Stewart; August 3, 1923 – July 21, 2016) was a translator at Bletchley Park during the Second World War. She later provided translation and expertise for the Nuremberg Trials.

Background 
Elisabeth Hardy studied Modern Languages at Glasgow University. From 1942-1945, as an expert in German, she worked at Bletchley Park as a member of the Hut 3, translating the military intelligence in the decrypted Nazi and Luftwaffe messages.

From 1945 to 1948 Hardy served as an expert during the Nuremberg trials, providing information on Nazi chain of command and German translation.

During the Nuremberg trials she met and married Alexander G. Hardy, a senior U.S. prosecutor on the Medical Case. After this she moved to the United States.

References 

Nuremberg trials
1923 births
2016 deaths
20th-century British translators
German–English translators
Bletchley Park women
Alumni of the University of Glasgow
Bletchley Park people
British expatriates in Germany
British expatriates in the United States